The Sorceress is a painting by John William Waterhouse completed between 1911 and 1915. It is his third depiction, after Circe Offering the Cup to Ulysses (1891) and Circe Invidiosa (1892), of the Greek mythological character, Circe, and her name is on the back of the canvas. The inclusion of leopards and the loom offer further evidence that the painting is of Circe.

An oil study for The Sorceress (c. 1911, 61×51 cm, in a private collection) shows a model with dark brown hair. For the final scene, Circe is depicted as a redhead.

See also
Circe in the arts

References

External links
Study for The Sorceress 

Paintings by John William Waterhouse
Paintings of Greek goddesses
1910s paintings
Witches in art
Books in art
Cats in art
Circe